Ophthalmic veins are veins which drain the eye.

More specifically, they can refer to:
 Superior ophthalmic vein
 Inferior ophthalmic vein

Human eye anatomy